Hot ice may refer to:

In chemistry:
Sodium acetate, a salt commonly used in a supersaturated solution with water to produce heat and salt crystals, which resemble ice
Heating pad, a common application of sodium acetate
Hand warmer, another common application of sodium acetate
Mpemba effect, an assertion that hotter water freezes faster
In entertainment:
Hot Ice (1952 film), a British comedy crime film directed by Kenneth Hume
Hot Ice (1955 film), a 1955 comedy film featuring The Three Stooges
Hot Ice (1978 film), a 1978 erotic film by Stephen C. Apostolof
Hot Ice (1987 film), a 1987 Australian film about a private detective
The Hot Ice Show, a long-running ice show located in England
"Hot Ice" Hilda, a character in the anime/manga series, Outlaw Star